Mennville is a small Russian Mennonite community just north of Riverton, Manitoba. The community is based around the Mennville Evangelical Mennonite Church. The other main buildings are the Mennville Christian School and the Appledale Apartments. The community is located in the Rural Municipality of Bifrost.

Unincorporated communities in Interlake Region, Manitoba
Mennonitism in Manitoba